The Jamnagar Refinery  is the private sector crude oil refinery owned by Reliance Industries in Jamnagar, Gujarat, India. It is currently the largest refinery in the world.

History

On 25 December 2001, Reliance Petroleum Limited (RPL) announced the commissioning of its refinery into a Special Economic Zone in Jamnagar district of Gujarat, India.

The globally competitive RPL refinery was commissioned in 36 months. RPL contracted several companies having expertise in engineering construction and refining like Bechtel, UOP LLC and Foster Wheeler (Multinational Company)amongst others. There were plans for the pipeline to process High Pour Point crude oil extracted at Barmer, Rajasthan, although this would require an electrically heated traced pipeline to be set up from Barmer to Jamnagar.

If all of the pipes used in the refinery were laid out, one after another, they would connect the whole of India from north to south.

Export expansion during the 2020 COVID-19 pandemic

In 2020, during the COVID-19 pandemic the domestic demand for polymer strongly declined in India. As a result, in order to keep production and sales running, Reliance Industries Limited management decided to refocus the production of polymer on export markets. With the help of the Maersk shipping and logistics group, exports from the Jamnagar Refinery were quadrupled to over 10,000 x 40' containers, which transported and exported through Port Pipavav.

See also
List of oil refineries
Petrochemicals
Chemical engineering

References

External links
 

Oil refineries in India
Reliance Industries
Jamnagar district
1999 establishments in Gujarat
Energy infrastructure completed in 1999
Companies based in Gujarat
Energy in Gujarat
Manufacturing plants of Reliance Industries
Indian companies established in 1999
20th-century architecture in India